naim is a messaging and chat program written by Daniel Reed in C; it supports the protocols AIM, ICQ, IRC, and RPI's Lily CMC protocols. Unlike most messaging clients, it is not graphical; it runs from the console using the ncurses library. naim is free software, licensed under the GNU GPL.

naim is a multiplatform program. It is primarily aimed at Unix-like systems.

naim uses the AOL instant messenger TOC protocol instead of the OSCAR protocol. This means naim lacks some features other instant messaging services have.

References

Further reading
 Martin Brown (7 September 2005) Free IRC clients, Choosing the best IRC client for your needs, Free Software Magazine issue 7, web page 3
 Robert Shingledecker, John Andrews, Christopher Negus, The official Damn Small Linux book: the tiny adaptable Linux that runs on anything, Prentice Hall, 2008, p. 64

External links 
naim web site

AIM (software) clients
Internet Relay Chat clients
Free Internet Relay Chat clients
Instant messaging clients for Linux
Free instant messaging clients
Software that uses ncurses